Tân Hồng is a rural district (huyện) of Đồng Tháp province in the Mekong Delta region of Vietnam. As of 2003, the district had a population of 79,321. The district covers an area of 291.5 km². The district capital lies at Sa Rài.

Divisions
The district is divided into the following communes:

 An Phước
 Bình Phú
 Sa Rài
 Thông Bình
 Tân Công Chí
 Tân Hộ Cơ
 Tân Phước
 Tân Thành A
 Tân Thành B

References

Districts of Đồng Tháp province